Restaurant Intim is a 1950 Swedish drama film directed by Hampe Faustman and starring Birger Malmsten, Åke Grönberg and Mimi Nelson. It was shot at the Råsunda Studios in Stockholm. The film's sets were designed by the art director Arne Åkermark.

About the movie 
The film is based on author Olle Länsberg's novel Restaurant Intim, published in 1945. The film premiered on March 3, 1950, at the Saga cinema on Kungsgatan in Stockholm. The film was shot in studios at AB Europa Studio in Sundbyberg and Filmstaden in Råsunda with exteriors from Restaurant Bellmansro on Djurgården and on board the archipelago boat Express II by Bertil Palmgren. Actor Hugo Jacobson made his last film role in the movie. He died one month after the premiere.

Cast
 Birger Malmsten as 	Alf Lindholm
 Åke Grönberg as 	Kalle Söderberg
 Mimi Nelson as 	Maja, waitress
 Irma Christenson as 	Ester
 Barbro Nordin as 	Pyret
 Fritiof Billquist as 	Bergertz, restaurant manager
 Dagmar Ebbesen as 	Josefsson
 Georg Skarstedt as 	Erik 'Hajen' Sehlstedt
 David Erikson as Eriksson, waiter
 Hugo Jacobsson as 	Andersson, waiter
 Hanny Schedin as 	Siv, waitress
 Barbro Elfvik as 	Maj-Britt
 Artur Rolén as 	Elov, waiter
 Barbro Flodquist as 	Mortell
 Alf Östlund as 	Manager Nessing
 Bengt Blomgren as 	Tage, Ester's husband
 Gösta Holmström as Gustav, Maja's husband
 Märta Arbin as 	Ester's mother
 Signe Wirff as Mrs. Söderberg, Kalle's mother
 Olav Riégo as 	Restaurant guest
 Signhild Björkman as 	Märta, restaurant guest
 Tord Stål as Åkesson, hygiene inspector
 Felix Alvo as 	Waiter
 Kate Gustin as 	Waitress
 Solveig Svensson as 	Waitress
 Monica Weinzierl as 	Vivi, Ester's daughter

References

Bibliography 
 Qvist, Per Olov & von Bagh, Peter. Guide to the Cinema of Sweden and Finland. Greenwood Publishing Group, 2000.

External links 
 

1950 films
Swedish drama films
1950 drama films
1950s Swedish-language films
Films directed by Hampe Faustman
1950s Swedish films